The 1942 Dartmouth Indians football team was an American football team that represented Dartmouth College as an independent during the 1942 college football season. In their second and final season under head coach Tuss McLaughry, the Indians compiled a 5–4 record. Edward Kast was the team captain.

Tom Douglas was the team's leading scorer, with 42 points (seven touchdowns).

Dartmouth played its home games at Memorial Field on the college campus in Hanover, New Hampshire.

Schedule

References

Dartmouth
Dartmouth Big Green football seasons
Dartmouth Indians football